Charles X. Ling (Chinese name: 凌晓峰) is a computer scientist who specializes in research on Data Mining and Machine Learning.

He obtained his BSc from Shanghai Jiao Tong University in 1985, and PhD from University of Pennsylvania in 1989.

He is currently a professor in the Department of Computer Science, and Science Distinguished Research Professor, at the University of Western Ontario, Canada. He has published over 150 refereed papers in international journals and conferences. He is a Senior member of IEEE.

He is co-author of book Crafting Your Research Future - A Guide to Successful Master's and Ph.D. Degrees in Science & Engineering.

He also does research and development in child gifted education, deriving from his work on artificial intelligence and cognitive science.

Bibliography 
IEEE Canada
NRC-IIT

References 
Publisher website

External links 
Charles X. Ling's academic website

Chinese computer scientists
Senior Members of the IEEE
University of Pennsylvania alumni
Living people
Academic staff of the University of Western Ontario
Year of birth missing (living people)
Place of birth missing (living people)
Shanghai Jiao Tong University alumni